Trine Bach Troelsen (born May 2, 1985 in Tarm) is a retired Danish team handball player who played for the Danish women's national handball team.

At the 2010 European Women's Handball Championship she reached the bronze final and placed fourth with the Danish team.

References

1985 births
Living people
Danish female handball players
People from Ringkøbing-Skjern Municipality
Handball players at the 2012 Summer Olympics
Olympic handball players of Denmark
Sportspeople from the Central Denmark Region